The Oberliga Westfalen is the highest level football league in the region of Westphalia, which is part of the state of North Rhine-Westphalia. The league existed from 1978 to 2008, but was then replaced by the NRW-Liga, a new statewide league. With the reform of the league system in 2012, which reduced the Regionalliga West  to clubs from North Rhine-Westphalia only and disbanded the NRW-Liga below it, the Oberliga Westfalen was reintroduced as the highest tier in the region and the fifth level overall in Germany. It is one of fourteen Oberligas in German football, the fifth tier of the German football league system.

Overview
The league was formed in 1978 as a highest level of play for the region of Westphalia, which used to be split into two groups and covered the eastern half of the state of North Rhine-Westphalia. The main reason for the creation of this league was to allow its champion direct promotion to the 2nd Bundesliga Nord rather than having to go through a promotion play-off. The league was created from nine clubs from the Verbandsliga Westfalen-Nordost and eight from the Verbandsliga Westfalen-Südwest. The SC Herford was relegated from the 2. Bundesliga Nord to the new league.

The league was founded as the Amateur-Oberliga Westfalen, but from 1994 the name was shortened to Oberliga Westfalen.

With the introduction of the unified 2nd Bundesliga in 1981, direct promotion for the Oberliga champions became impossible again because there were eight of them competing for four promotion spots. The champion of the Oberliga Westfalen had to compete with the winner and the runner-up of the Oberliga Nord and the winners of the Oberliga Berlin and of the Oberliga Nordrhein for two 2. Bundesliga spots.

Upon creation of the Regionalligas in 1994, the champions of the Oberligas were directly promoted again, however the Oberligas slipped to fourth tier in the German football league system. The top six team of the Oberliga that year were admitted to the new Regionalliga West/Südwest, the clubs being:

TuS Paderborn-Neuhaus
SC Preußen Münster
Arminia Bielefeld
SpVgg Erkenschwick
SC Verl
SG Wattenscheid 09 II

With the reduction of the number of Regionalligas from four to two in 2000, the Oberliga Westfalen was now located below the Regionalliga Nord. However, the Sportfreunde Siegen, based in the very south of the region, played in the Regionalliga Süd.

With the creation of the 3rd Liga in 2008 the Oberliga Westfalen was replaced by the NRW-Liga, which now is the fifth tier of the league system. The Oberliga Westfalen ceased to exist after 30 seasons. Its clubs were split up over three league levels. The first four teams were promoted to the new Regionalliga West, clubs from place five to eleven went to the new Oberliga while the bottom seven teams were relegated to the Verbandsligas.

The league was reintroduced in 2012 after the NRW-Liga was disbanded again.

Throughout the league's existence the two leagues below the Oberliga were:
Verbandsliga Westfalen 1
Verbandsliga Westfalen 2

Champions of the Oberliga Westfalen 
The league champions:

Original league 1978 to 2008
The league champions of the first era of the league:

New league from 2012
The league champions and runners-up from 2012 onwards:

Placings in the Oberliga Westfalen

The final league placings in the second era of the league from 2012 to present:

Sources:

Founding members of the Oberliga Westfalen

From the 2nd Bundesliga Nord:

SC Herford

From the Verbandsliga Westfalen-Nordost:

1. FC Paderborn
VfB Rheine
TuS Schloß Neuhaus
SV Ahlen
Bünder SV
SV Emsdetten
SV Beckum
DJK Gütersloh (merged with Arminia Gütersloh to form FC Gütersloh in 1978)
TSG Harsewinkel

From the Verbandsliga Westfalen-Südwest:

SpVgg Erkenschwick
VfL Gevelsberg
Sportfreunde Siegen
DJK Hellweg Lütgendortmund
SuS Hüsten 09
SV Holzwickede
Eintracht Recklinghausen
VfB Altena

References

Sources
 Deutschlands Fußball in Zahlen,  An annual publication with tables and results from the Bundesliga to Verbandsliga/Landesliga. DSFS.
 Kicker Almanach,  The yearbook on German football from Bundesliga to Oberliga, since 1937. Kicker Sports Magazine.

External links 
 Das deutsche Fussball Archiv  Historic German league tables
 Westfalen Football Association (FLVW) 

 
Oberliga (football)
Organizations disestablished in 2008
Football competitions in North Rhine-Westphalia
1978 establishments in Germany
2008 disestablishments in Germany
2012 establishments in Germany